IdeaScale is a cloud-based software company that licenses an innovation management platform employing the principles and practices of crowdsourcing. The company was founded by Vivek Bhaskaran and Rob Hoehn in Seattle.

As of 2018, IdeaScale is headquartered in Berkeley, CA. In 2023, the company opened it's Washington, DC offices.

History 
In 2008, the IdeaScale service was first offered. In 2009, Rob Hoehn enhanced the service to further address opportunities he cited in both government and the private sector to solicit ideas, feedback, and priorities. It launched in tandem with President Barack Obama’s Open Government Initiative. In its first year, IdeaScale was adopted by 23 federal agencies. It served many organizations, including the Executive Office of the President of the United States.

The following year, the platform’s adoption rate expanded to include more than 36 agencies as well as numerous private Enterprise-level companies. Government clients cited IdeaScale’s “level of engagement as well as the platform’s affordability” as one of the reasons that it was adopted early on in the open government initiative. Since then, the platform has been used by numerous government organizations from the federal to the local level and was even used by the New York City Police Department to gather feedback and quality of life priorities from citizens.

As of 2014, IdeaScale had close to 4 million members and over 25,000 communities. The company is privately held. It was bootstrapped without venture capital funding and has become profitable. IdeaScale was also ranked #513 on the Inc. 5000 List of Fastest Growing Companies. and acquired Ideavibes as part of its continued growth. In 2016, IdeaScale acquired Innovationmanagement.se

In 2022, the company hired a new executive, Nick Jain, to take over for retiring CEO Rob Hoehn. Nick is a serial executive who graduated as a Baker Scholar from Harvard Business School previously co-led two companies. Under the new leadership team, IdeaScale achieved the dual success of both increased profitability and headcount growth.

Features 
Users create a profile on IdeaScale and once they are members of a community, they can submit ideas, comment and vote on other ideas, and the most popular ideas are prioritized at the top based on the number of votes the idea receives. Once a promising idea has been identified, the software allows teams to form around the idea. The team can add more information to the idea, refine it, propose it to leadership and the best ones are selected using sophisticated decision matrix capabilities.

The company uses the freemium model of engagement, offering free communities on an open basis and additional, customized functionality to paying clients.

Notes 

Crowdsourcing
Software companies based in the San Francisco Bay Area
Software companies established in 2009
2009 establishments in Washington (state)